Cradle is a 2010 sculpture by Ball-Nogues Studio, installed in Santa Monica, California, United States. The artwork was commissioned by the City of Santa Monica, and assembled in Burbank. James Jones was the project's lead fabricator.

See also 

 2010 in art
 List of public art in Santa Monica, California

References

2010 establishments in California
2010 sculptures
Outdoor sculptures in Santa Monica, California